Sundarapandiam is a panchayat town in Srivilliputhur Taluk- old, Virudhunagar district in the Indian state of Tamil Nadu.

Geography

Water bodies
Sundarapandiam is located at river bed of Arjuna. Many small lakes are located around this place, namely, Senkulum, Periyakulam, and Karisalkulam. The main source of drinking water is taken underground.

Demographics
 India census, Sundarapandiam had a population of 8547. Males constitute 50% of the population and females 50%. Sundarapandiam has an average literacy rate of 60%, higher than the national average of 59.5%: male literacy is 71%, and female literacy is 49%. In Sundarapandiam, 8% of the population is under 6 years of age. Weaving and Agriculture are  Main occupations of the people living here.

Transport
Sundarapandiam (major panchayat) is located one 1 km from the main road between Krishnankoil and Watrap. Approximately, every 30 minutes a bus leaves from Srivilliputtur (via, Krishnancoil) or from Watrap to this place. Another mode of reaching to Sundarapandiam by auto. Take an auto from Krishnankoil which is located 6 km away.

Krishnankoil can be reached around the clock by taking a bus at Madurai (Mattuthavani) bound for Senkottai/Tenkasi/Rajapalayam. It is located 80 km from Madurai.

Nearest Railway Station: Srivilliputtur (15 km distant)

Education

List of Festivals
Apart from Tamilar's main festivals of Deepavali & Thai Pongal, 3 main local festivals are celebrated in Grand manner they are
 Muthallamman Pongal
 Mariamman and Kaliamman Pongal
 Muppidari Amman Pongal
 Maha Shiva Rathiri 
 Kalleri Mariyamman Pongal
 Chithirai Thiruvizha celebrate at Sri Vaikundamoorthy temple ( periya kovil locally )
The special in Mariamman Pongal is --- This Festival is Celebrated in Nine days. The wonderful thing is that while celebrating this 9 days, all days there will be rainfall in the Village as Mari means " Rain" will be proved.
(Updated by Balamurugan.B)

List of schools
Government Higher Secondary School
Union Elementary School
Viveka School (English Medium)
Saliyar Elementary School
Sithi Vinayagar Elementary School, Agatthapatti

Nearest Airport : Madurai (70 km distant)

Adjacent communities   
Agathapatti
Sempatti
Venkatapuram
Ramachandrapuram
Madurapuri

Reference 

Cities and towns in Virudhunagar district